Arthur Creyke England (1872 - 1946) was an Anglican clergyman in the first half of the twentieth century.

Biography
England was born in Bolton Percy and educated at St John's College, Cambridge. After a curacies in Grimsby and Hull he held Incumbencies in Sculcoates, Hessle and Kirby Misperton. He was Rural Dean of Hull (1924–28) Rural Dean of Pickering (1928–33); Canon Missioner for the Diocese of York 1929–33; and Archdeacon of York  and Treasurer of York Minster from 1933 until his death on 30 September 1946

Notes

Archdeacons of York
Alumni of St John's College, Cambridge
1946 deaths
1872 births